Arthur Simon (born July 28, 1930) is founder and former president of Bread for the World, a citizens' lobby on hunger, which he served for almost two decades. He was born in Eugene, Oregon.

Career
Simon is a graduate of Dana College in Blair, Nebraska, and Concordia Seminary in St. Louis, Missouri. He is an ordained Lutheran minister. His brother was United States Senator Paul Simon (D-IL). He pastored at Trinity Lutheran Church on New York City's Lower East Side from 1961 to 1972. Before retiring, he directed the Washington Office of the Christian Children's Fund from 1992 to 1997.

His book Bread for the World won the national Religious Book Award, and was described by the Nobel Prize economist Gunnar Myrdal as a "clear and convincing" analysis of world hunger. His most recent book is Silence Can Kill: Speaking Up to End Hunger and Make our Economy Work for Everyone. In 2009 he published The Rising of Bread for the World: An Outcry of Citizens Against Hunger. Prior to that, he authored, with David Beckmann, Grace at the Table: Ending Hunger in God’s World. His previous books include Faces of Poverty and Harvesting Peace: The Arms Race and Human Need. He has also had articles published in many national newspapers and journals.

Simon received a number of awards and honorary degrees, including the Presidential Hunger Award for Lifetime Achievement. He has served on the advisory board for the Center for Public Justice. He was the 35th recipient the Pacem in Terris Peace and Freedom Award in 2004. The honor was named after a 1963 encyclical letter, Pacem in terris (Peace on Earth), by Pope John XXIII that calls upon all people of good will to secure peace among all nations.

References

External links
Bread for the World

1930 births
Living people
American activists
American Lutherans
American Christian clergy
American non-fiction writers
Writers from Eugene, Oregon
Concordia Seminary alumni